Empress Elisabeth Memorial Church (German: Kaiserin-Elisabeth-Gedächtniskirche) is a small Roman Catholic church on the Schneeberg in Lower Austria. It is close to the mountain station of the Schneebergbahn.

The church was commissioned by Emperor Franz Joseph I of Austria in the memory of Empress Elisabeth of Austria in 1901. The plans were by the architect Rudolf Goebel, and it was designed in the Jugendstil. The consecration was on 5 September 1901 by the Viennese auxiliary bishop Godfried Marschall.

See also 
 Emperor Maximilian Memorial Chapel
 Votivkirche, Vienna

External links 

 Official homepage

Art Nouveau church buildings in Austria